Eriogonum caespitosum is a species of wild buckwheat known by the common name matted buckwheat, mat buckwheat, or cushion desert buckwheat. It is a common perennial plant native to the western United States from California to Montana, especially the Great Basin. Flowering early in the summer, it is also cultivated as a rock garden plant.

The species is a tough perennial plant which grows in flat, woody mats in sand and gravel substrates. From the mat emerge short stalks with inflorescences of greenish-yellow and whitish rounded clusters of flowers, which redden with age and hang backwards over the edge of the involucre. Some of the flowers are bisexual and up to a centimeter wide each, and some are only staminate and much smaller.

References

External links
Jepson Manual Treatment
Photo gallery

caespitosum
Flora of California
Flora of the Great Basin
Flora of the Western United States
Flora without expected TNC conservation status